Boreal may refer to:

Climatology and geography
Boreal (age), the first climatic phase of the Blytt-Sernander sequence of northern Europe, during the Holocene epoch
Boreal climate, a climate characterized by long winters and short, cool to mild summers
Boreal ecosystem, an ecosystem with a subarctic climate in the Northern Hemisphere
Boreal forest, a biome characterized by coniferous forests
Boreal Sea, a Mesozoic-era seaway

Companies and organizations
Boreale, a Quebec microbrewery
Boreal Mountain Resort, a ski resort in the Lake Tahoe area of California
Boreal Norge, a Norwegian public transport operator
Collège Boréal, a francophone college in Ontario, Canada

Other uses
 Boreal (horse), a racehorse
 Carlo Boreal, a fictional character in Philip Pullman's His Dark Materials trilogy
Le Boreal, a French cruise ship
 Borealism, the exoticisation of the northern regions of the Earth and their cultures

See also
Boreal forest of Canada, a region covering much of Canada's land area
Boreal Forest Conservation Framework, a plan to protect the Canadian boreal forest
Borean languages, a hypothetical language family comprising languages of the Northern Hemisphere
Boreal Shield Ecozone (CEC), region of ancient rock in Canada
Borea (disambiguation)
Borealis (disambiguation)
Boreas (disambiguation)
Septentrional